Kapitolina Seryogina (born 17 January 1942) is a Russian speed skater. She competed in two events at the 1972 Winter Olympics, representing the Soviet Union.

References

External links
 

1942 births
Living people
Russian female speed skaters
Olympic speed skaters of the Soviet Union
Speed skaters at the 1972 Winter Olympics
Universiade gold medalists for the Soviet Union
Universiade medalists in speed skating
Competitors at the 2013 Winter Universiade